Pat Crow (born April 11, 1966) is a former professional tennis player from the United States.

Crow was a qualifier for the main draw of the 1991 US Open and faced Michael Joyce in the opening round. He lost in four sets.

References

1966 births
Living people
American male tennis players
Tennis players from Long Beach, California